Ana Ravelo is a paleoceanographer known for her research on tropical oceans. She is a professor at the University of California Santa Cruz and was elected a fellow of the American Geophysical Union in 2012.

Early life 
Ravelo grew up in a suburb of Los Angeles where she enjoyed hiking, skiing and other outdoor activities. Science and math captured her academic interests, but she was also interested in cultural differences and stories about race which she investigated in books by Toni Morrison, Zora Neale Hurston, and Amy Tan. Her father was a cardiologist in Cuba and subsequently practiced in Brooklyn, and her mother was trained as a pharmacist while in the Philippines.

Education and career 
Ravelo attended public schools until high school when she moved to a private school in Pasena. She went to Stanford University for her undergraduate education where she double-majored in anthropology and geology which she combined into studies on paleoanthropology. During her time at Stanford she became interested in oceanography, especially paleoceanography, which attracted her because it combines physics, math, chemistry, and biology. After finishing her undergraduate work in 1994, Ravelo moved to Columbia University where she received an M.A., M.Phil, and a Ph.D. in geological sciences. She spent time as a postdoctoral investigator at Princeton University where she modeled changes in ocean conditions. In 1991, Ravelo moved to the University of California Santa Cruz where she is a professor in the ocean sciences department.

From 2005 until 2011, Ravelo served as the director of the Santa Cruz branch of the Institute of Geophysics and Planetary Physics, a University of California research initiative designed to foster interdisciplinary research.

Research 
Ravelo's research centers on the tropical ocean, especially the Pacific ocean. Her Ph.D. research examined different species of foraminifera and used their geochemistry to reconstruct changes in temperature over geologic eras. Ravelo uses a combination of collection of samples from the field, such as from sites in the Bering Sea where she led a 2009 expedition to collect sediment samples that allow her to examine changes in the region's temperatures over the last 4.5 million years. She also uses climate modeling to examine past changes in the ocean's hydrography, nitrogen cycling, and carbon dioxide concentrations. In the Pacific Ocean, Ravelo's research revealed a shift to El Niño-like conditions in the Pliocene, 4.5 to 3 million years ago. In 2021, Ravelo's research revealed a history of recurrent hypoxia in the Bering Sea, which results from productivity fueled by iron from continental shelves.

Selected publications

Awards and honors 
Fellow, American Geophysical Union (2012)
Fellow, California Academy of Arts and Sciences (2020)

Personal life
Ravelo has three children.

References

External links 
 

Fellows of the American Geophysical Union
Stanford University alumni
Columbia University alumni
University of California, Santa Cruz faculty
Living people
Women geologists
American oceanographers
Year of birth missing (living people)